is a Japanese voice actress and singer. She played Kotori Minami in Love Live! School Idol Project and Kaban in Kemono Friends. She released the single "Sign/Candy Flavor", the song "Sign" was used as the ending theme for The Quintessential Quintuplets. Her nickname is Ucchi.

Filmography

Television animation

Original video animation (OVA)
Baby Princess 3D Paradise 0 (2011), Hotaru Amatsuka

Original net animation (ONA)
Junji Ito Maniac: Japanese Tales of the Macabre (2023), Izumi Murakami

Films
Strike Witches the Movie (2012), Shizuka Hattori
Space Battleship Yamato 2199: Odyssey of the Celestial Ark (2014), Warrant Officer Yuria Misaki
Love Live! The School Idol Movie (2015), Kotori Minami
Trinity Seven the Movie: The Eternal Library and the Alchemist Girl (2017), Arin Kannazuki
Trinity Seven: Heavens Library & Crimson Lord (2019), Arin Kannazuki
Strike Witches: 501st Joint Fighter Wing Take Off! (2019), Shizuka Hattori
Frame Arms Girl: Kyakkyau Fufu na Wonderland (2019), Innocentia

Video games
Shin Megami Tensei: Devil Survivor 2 (2011), Io Nitta
Love Live! School Idol Festival (2013), Kotori Minami
The Guided Fate Paradox (2013), Asagi (credited as "Kotori Minami")
Bullet Girls (2014)
Danganronpa Another Episode: Ultra Despair Girls (2014), Komaru Naegi
Defense Witches (2014), Jill
Omega Labyrinth (2015), Nako Mito
Cyberdimension Neptunia: 4 Goddesses Online (2017), Bouquet / GM
Lilycle Rainbow Stage!!! (2019), Alice Kugayama
Kandagawa Jet Girls (2020), Inori Misuda
Goddess of Victory: Nikke (2023), Quency

Mobile games
Granblue Fantasy (2016), Andira
Magia Record (2017), Tsukasa Amane & Umika Misaki
Koekatsu (2018), Yuina Sasaki
Dragalia Lost (2018), Melsa
Destiny Child, Harmony Medb
Overhit, Sophia
Azur Lane, Centaur
Alchemy Stars, Eicy & Ansia

Japanese dub
And Just Like That..., Lily Goldenblatt (Cathy Ang)
The Lego Ninjago Movie, Nya (Abbi Jacobson)
Pitch Perfect (Parco/Happinet edition), Aubrey Posen (Anna Camp)
Starship Troopers: Traitor of Mars, Amy Snapp

Discography
For her Discography as Minami Kotori as part of μ's look here

Albums

Mini albums

Singles

References

External links
  
 Official agency profile 
 
 Official Music Information 
 Official Music Channel on YouTube

1986 births
Living people
Voice actresses from Gunma Prefecture
Japanese women pop singers
Japanese video game actresses
Japanese voice actresses
Anime singers
21st-century Japanese actresses
21st-century Japanese women singers
21st-century Japanese singers
Μ's members
Across Entertainment voice actors
Music YouTubers
Japanese YouTubers